Still waters is an anapodoton (shortening) of the proverb still waters run deep. 

Still Waters alone may refer to:

Film
 Still Waters (1928 film), a Krazy Kat animated film
Still Waters (2000 film), a Russian film
Still Waters (1915 film), a film directed by J. Searle Dawley
Still Waters, a short documentary about P. K. Page

Books
Still Waters (novel), a 1949 novel by E.C.R. Lorac
Still Waters, a novel by Jennifer Lauck

Music
Still Waters (Bee Gees album), an album by the Bee Gees
Still Waters (Louise Setara album), an album by Louise Setara
Still Waters, composition by Tony Banks (musician) of Genesis
Still Waters (Breakbot album), an album by Breakbot

See also
Still Waters Run Deep (disambiguation)
Stillwater (disambiguation)
Stilwater, a fictional city in video game Saints Row